Thomas Arundel (1353–1414) was archbishop of Canterbury and opponent of the Lollards.

Thomas Arundel or Arundell may also refer to:
Thomas Fitzalan, 5th Earl of Arundel (1381–1415), English nobleman, opponent of King Richard II
Thomas Arundell (MP died 1443), MP for Cornwall
 Sir Thomas Arundell (1454–1485), English nobleman
Thomas Arundell of Wardour Castle (c. 1502–1552), English courtier
Thomas Arundell, 1st Baron Arundell of Wardour (c. 1560–1639)
Thomas Arundell, 2nd Baron Arundell of Wardour (c. 1586–1643), English nobleman
Thomas Arundell (of Duloe) (died 1648),  English politician